Mayet (also Miiut and Miit, meaning the cat) is the name of an ancient Egyptian girl buried in the mortuary temple of king Mentuhotep II (reigned c. 2061 BC – 2010 BC)  at Deir el-Bahari. Her burial was found intact. Her position within the royal family of Mentuhotep II is disputed.

The burial of Mayet was found in 1921 by an American expedition guided by Herbert Eustis Winlock. Her burial was discovered at the back of a columned structure, at the centre of the complex. At the back of the structure were discovered six burials with shrines. Five of these burials belonged to royal women (Ashait, Henhenet, Kawit, Kemsit and Sadeh) with the title king's wife. The burial of Mayet was the sixth one. However, Mayet does not bear any title on her preserved objects. Her status in relation to the king and to the other women remains obscure. It is generally assumed that she was a daughter of the king as she was about five years old when she died.

The burial of Mayet was found at the bottom of a shaft. The girl was placed in a set of two coffins. The outer one was a sarcophagus made of limestone and inscribed with simple offering formulae. This sarcophagus was much bigger than required, suggesting that it was not destined to her, that her death was unexpected and no arrangements had been made in prevision of it. 
The inner coffin was made of wood and also inscribed with simple offering formulae. Both containers were originally made for a different person. There are signs that the name was altered for Mayet. The body of Mayet was wrapped in linen and adorned with a mummy mask. Five necklaces were found around her neck, some of them made of gold and silver.

References 

21st-century BC Egyptian people
21st-century BC women
People of the Eleventh Dynasty of Egypt
Ancient Egyptian mummies
Mentuhotep II